William Huntington Reeves (born 1963/64) is an American businessman and the co-founder of the hedge fund, BlueCrest Capital Management.

Early life
Reeves has a BA in English from Yale University, and an MA in Philosophy from New York University.

Career
Reeves is a former trader of JP Morgan and Chase Company.  In 2000, he co-founded BlueCrest Capital Management with Michael Platt.

In 2009, he and Platt owned 75% of BlueCrest. In 2010, he was reported to have a net worth of £375 million.

References

1960s births
Living people
Stock and commodity market managers
American hedge fund managers
American investors
American stock traders
Yale College alumni
New York University alumni